Xicheng District is a district of Beijing. Xicheng District spans , covering the western half of the old city (largely inside the 2nd Ring Road - the eastern half is Dongcheng District), and has 706,691 inhabitants (2000 Census). Its postal code is 100032. Xicheng is subdivided into 15 subdistricts of the city proper of Beijing. The former Xuanwu District was merged into Xicheng in July 2010.

The Xidan commercial district, Beijing Financial Street (Jinrongjie), Beihai Park, Jingshan Park, Shichahai and Zhongnanhai are within its jurisdiction. The popular Houhai bar area is also in Xicheng Precinct.  Before the 1911 Revolution, most royalty and aristocrats resided in the precinct. The oldest Catholic church in Beijing, the Cathedral of the Immaculate Conception is located in Xicheng.

Administrative divisions
There are 15 subdistricts in the district:

Economy
COSCO has its headquarters in the Ocean Plaza building in Xicheng. The Xinhua News Agency has its headquarters in the Dacheng Plaza (大成大厦 Dàchéng Dàshà) in Xicheng.

In addition Bank of China, China Construction Bank, the State Grid Corporation of China, China National Nuclear Corporation, and Taikang Life Insurance also have their headquarters in Xicheng.

Government
The Chinese Ministry of Education is headquartered in Xidan, Xicheng District.

The Chinese Academy of Sciences is headquartered in Xicheng District.

The China Food and Drug Administration is headquartered in Xicheng District.

The Hong Kong and Macau Affairs Office headquarters is in Xicheng District. The Office of the Government of the HKSAR in Beijing is in Xicheng District.

Important areas in Xicheng District
Imperial City
Beijing Financial Street
Zhongnanhai
Beihai Park
Jingshan Park
Shichahai
Drum Tower and Bell Tower
Prince Gong's Residence (Gongwang Fu)
Xinjiekou
Xidan
Xisi
Qianmen
Dashilar
Liulichang(an ancient antiques market since Qing Dynasty)
Beijing Zoo
Fayuan Temple
Huguang Guild Hall
Miaoying Temple
Niujie Mosque

Transport

Metro
Xicheng is served by seven metro lines of the Beijing Subway:
  - Muxidi, Nanlishilu, Xidan , Tian'anmen West
  - Guloudajie , Jishuitan, Xizhimen , Chegongzhuang , Fuchengmen, Changchunjie, Hepingmen
  - Chegongzhuang West, Chegongzhuang , Ping'anli , Beihai North
  - Wanzi, Daguanying, Guang'anmennei, Caishikou , Hufangqiao
  - Xizhimen

Suburban Railway
Xicheng is served by one commuter line operated by Beijing Suburban Railway (BCR).
  - Beijing North railway station

Education

Primary and secondary schools

The High School Affiliated to Beijing Normal University is in Xicheng; it was located in Xuanwu District before Xicheng absorbed Xuanwu. Beijing No.4 High School is also in Xicheng District.

One school in Niujie, the Beijing Xuanwu Huimin Elementary School (S: 北京市宣武回民小学, P: Běijīng Shì Xuānwǔ Huímín Xiǎoxué), serves the Hui people living in the area. It used to be in Xuanwu District.

The Beijing Municipal Commission of Education, the local education authority, used to be headquartered in Xicheng District.

Post-secondary schools
People's Public Security University of China is in Xicheng.

The Central Conservatory of Music is based in Xicheng, near Fuxingmen and Changchunjie stations.

References

External links

Official website of Xicheng District Government 
Photo Gallery of Houhai area Includes 20 high quality photographs
Photo Gallery of Qianhai area Includes 20 high quality photographs

 
Districts of Beijing